The Treo 755p is a smartphone developed by Palm, Inc. It was released on May 15, 2007 as the first CDMA Treo without an aerial antenna. This Treo has a form factor similar to that of the GSM Treo 680, and is equipped with the full Palm OS. It has been described as a Treo 700p in a Treo 680's body.

Carriers
The Treo 755p is no longer sold through any USA based carrier, but was previously available through Sprint Nextel, Verizon Wireless, Alltel, and Telus.  In Canada, the Treo 755p was available from Telus Mobility.

Specifications
Operating system: Palm OS 5.4.9
Storage: 128 MB (60 user-accessible) Non-Volatile File System RAM
Processor: Intel XScale 312 MHz
Screen: 320 by 320 Color 2x2 in. TFT, 65,536 Colors
External ringer on/off switch w/vibrate mode

Wireless Antenna: 
CDMA 800/1900 MHz digital dual-band
CDMA2000 EvDO Rev 0, backwards compatible with 1xRTT and IS-95 networks
Bluetooth 1.2
Camera: 1.3 Megapixel, 1280x1024 resolution, 2X digital zoom, automatic light balance
Audio: 2.5 mm stereo headphone jack, compatible with wireless headsets using Bluetooth connectivity
Input: Touchscreen, QWERTY thumb keyboard with integrated number dial pad
Personal speakerphone
Microphone mute option
TTY/TDD compatibility
3-way calling
Support for miniSD cards
Removable, 1600 mAh rechargeable lithium-ion battery
Talk time up to 4.2 hours, standby time up to 240 hours
Size 2.3" W x 4.4" H x 0.8" D; 58.4 mm W x 117 mm H x 20.3 mm D
Weight 5.6 ounces; 159 grams

See also
Treo 680
Treo 700p
Palm Treo smartphones

References

External links
Palm's 755p support page
Review at Palm Info Center

Palm OS devices
Smartphones
Palm mobile phones